Rodrigo Alborno Ortega (born 12 August 1993) is a Paraguayan footballer who plays as a left back or left winger for River Plate.

Club career
Born in Asunción, Alborno started his career with local giants Libertad, joining the club's youth setup in 2007, aged 13. Three years later he was promoted to the first-team squad, and played his first match as a professional on 30 January 2010, starting in a 0–1 loss at Guaraní; roughly a month later he scored his first senior goal, netting his side's only in a 1–1 draw at Sportivo Trinidense.

In April 2011 Alborno agreed a five-year deal with Italian Serie A side Internazionale, with the deal being effective only in August. Initially assigned to the reserve squad, he appeared regularly during the NextGen series winning campaign.

On 14 July 2012 Alborno was loaned to Novara with a co-ownership clause at the end of the season; A year later he moved to Cittadella, also on loan.

Honours
 NextGen series: 2012 (Inter Primavera)
 Campionato Nazionale Primavera: 2012 (Inter Primavera)

References

External links
Profile at BDFA.com.ar 
Interview at El Pelota 

1993 births
Living people
Sportspeople from Asunción
Paraguayan footballers
Paraguay under-20 international footballers
Association football defenders
Association football wingers
Club Libertad footballers
Inter Milan players
Novara F.C. players
A.S. Cittadella players
Deportivo Capiatá players
Club Guaraní players
River Plate (Asunción) footballers
Paraguayan Primera División players
Serie B players
Paraguayan expatriate footballers
Paraguayan expatriate sportspeople in Italy
Expatriate footballers in Italy